The 2015 NATC trials season was the 42nd season. It consisted of ten trials events in three main classes: Pro, Expert and Women's Expert Sportsman. It began on 11 April, with round one in Amarillo, Texas and ended with round ten in Casper, Wyoming on 8 August.

Season summary
Patrick Smage would claim his eighth NATC Trials Championship in 2015.

2015 NATC trials season calendar

Scoring system
Points were awarded to the top twenty finishers in each class. The best of nine rounds counted for the Pro class and the Expert class, the best five in Women's Expert Sportsman West and the best three in the Women's Expert Sportsman East class.

NATC Pro final standings

{|
|

NATC Expert final standings

{|
|

NATC Women's Expert Sportsman West final standings

{|
|

NATC Women's Expert Sportsman East final standings

{|
|

References

Motorcycle trials
2015 in motorcycle sport